Arta is a highly endangered Negrito language of the northern Philippines.

Distribution
Lawrence Reid's 1990 fieldwork revealed only 12 speakers in Villa Santiago, Aglipay, Quirino Province, and in 1992 it was spoken by only three families. It is not closely related to other languages.

There are still small groups of Arta speakers in Maddela and Nagtipunan towns of Quirino Province (Lobel 2013:88). Kimoto (2017) reports that Arta has 10 native speakers and 35–45 second-language speakers living primarily in Pulang Lupa, Kalbo, and in Disimungal, Nagtipunan.

The Arta are found in the following places within Nagtipunan Municipality.
Nagtipunan Municipality
Disimungal Barangay
Purok Kalbo
Pulang Lupa
Tilitilan
San Ramos Barangay
Pongo Barangay
Sangbay Barangay

Arta is in contact with Casiguran Agta, Nagtipunan Agta, Yogad, Ilokano, and Tagalog.

Phonology
Arta is notable for having vowel length distinction, an unusual typological feature in the Philippines.

Sound changes
Kimoto (2017: 56–67) lists the following sound changes from Proto-Malayo-Polynesian (PMP) to Arta. Long vowels in Arta are derived from PMP diphthongs.

Lexical innovations
Kimoto (2017: 4) lists the following Arta lexical innovations (highlighted in bold). Lexical innovations in Casiguran Agta are also highlighted in bold.

Reid (1994) lists the following reconstructed forms as possible non-Austronesian lexical elements found exclusively in Arta. Forms from Kimoto (2018) have also been included. Note the use of orthographic è [ə] and ng [ŋ].

Reid (1994) lists the following reconstructed forms as possible non-Austronesian lexical elements found in both Arta and "North Agta" (i.e., various Northeastern Luzon languages spoken mostly in Cagayan Province). Forms from Kimoto (2018) have also been included.

The forms *səlub 'fragrant' and *Rəbi 'pity, kindness' are found in both Arta and Alta.

References

Kimoto, Yukinori. 2017. A Grammar of Arta: A Philippine Negrito Language. Ph.D dissertation, Kyoto University.

External links 
 ELAR documentation and description of Arta language

Aeta languages
Endangered Austronesian languages
Languages of Quirino
Northern Luzon languages